The Zhaoying Formation is a Coniacian geologic formation in Henan Province, China. Fossil dinosaur eggs of Ovaloolithus sp. have been reported from the formation.

See also 
 List of dinosaur-bearing rock formations
 List of stratigraphic units with dinosaur trace fossils
 Dinosaur eggs

References

Bibliography

Further reading 
 Y. Li, Y. Liu, X. Chen and G. Zhao. 1996. Dinosaurian Embryo II: Young Dinosaur-bones in Ovaloolithus. Earth Science - Journal of China University of Geosciences 21(6):608-610

Geologic formations of China
Upper Cretaceous Series of Asia
Cretaceous China
Coniacian Stage
Siltstone formations
Ooliferous formations
Paleontology in Henan